The discography of S Club 8, a British pop group, who released two studio albums, seven singles and seven music videos. It also features one album, two singles and two music videos released from the TV series I Dream.

The group formed as S Club Juniors in 2001 and their debut album, Together, was released by Polydor and Universal Records in the United Kingdom in October 2002. Their debut single, "One Step Closer", reached number two in the United Kingdom upon its release in April 2002. The album also included the singles "Automatic High", "New Direction" and "Puppy Love". The album peaked at number five on the UK Albums Chart and was certified silver by the British Phonographic Industry (BPI).

The group released their second album, Sundown, which peaked eight places lower at number 13 in the UK. The album spawned the singles "Fool No More", "Sundown" and "Don't Tell Me You're Sorry". In 2004, the group appeared as characters on the children's television series I Dream and subsequently recorded the album Welcome to Avalon Heights under the name I Dream. Calvin Goldspink and Frankie Sandford, two members of the group, released a further single titled "Dreaming".

Albums

Studio albums

Singles

As I Dream

Albums
2004: Welcome to Avalon Heights

Singles
2004: "Dreaming" #19 UK
2004: "Say It's Alright" #32 FRA

References
General

Specific

External links
 

Pop music group discographies
Discography